In music theory, the descending tetrachord is a series of four notes from a scale, or tetrachord, arranged in order from highest to lowest, or descending order. For example, --- , as created by the Andalusian cadence. The descending tetrachord may fill a perfect fourth or a chromatic fourth.

See also
Chaconne
Lament bass

Sources

External links
"Tetrachord", Britannica.com.

Music theory